Glendale Community College may refer to one of two colleges in the United States:

 Glendale Community College (Arizona)
 Glendale Community College (California)